Alain Marcoen,  is a Belgian cinematographer. He is known for his work on L'enfant (2005), L'âge de raison, le cinéma des frères Dardenne (2013) and Two Days, One Night (2014).
Marcoen has frequently worked on films by the Dardenne brothers.

References

External links

Living people
Belgian cinematographers
1950 births